Yoon-Hong Kahn FRPSL is a Korean philatelist who was appointed to the Roll of Distinguished Philatelists in 1996, the first Korean to be so honoured. He is also the first to receive a gold medal at an international stamp exhibition for a display of Korean material. He is a fellow of the Royal Philatelic Society London. Kahn is a specialist in the philately of Korea, Japan and China.

References

Signatories to the Roll of Distinguished Philatelists
Fellows of the Royal Philatelic Society London
Philately of Korea
Philately of Japan
Philately of China
Philatelists
20th-century South Korean people
Year of birth missing (living people)
Living people